Orthotylus mariagratiae is a species of bug from the Miridae family that is endemic to Crete.

References

Insects described in 1984
Hemiptera of Europe
Endemic arthropods of Crete
mariagratiae